Cüneyt Tanman (born 16 January 1956, in Istanbul) is a Turkish former footballer who played as a centre-back. He made 17 appearances for the Turkey national team.

With the exception of the 1975–76 season where he was loaned to Giresunspor, Tanman player for Galatasaray during his football career. He played between 1974 and 1991 and used to play most positions for the team. He played 533 games for Galatasaray, most of them as the team captain. He won the Turkish title in 1987 and 1988.

He worked as manager of Galatasaray between 2004 and 2006 and currently works as a football commentator in newspapers.

Honours

As player
Galatasaray
 Süper Lig: 1986–87, 1987–88
 Turkish Cup: 1981–82, 1984–85, 1990–91
 Turkish Super Cup: 1981–82, 1986–87, 1987–88, 1990–91
 Chancellor Cup: 1978–79, 1985–86, 1989–90
 TSYD Cup: 1978, 1982, 1988

References

Living people
1956 births
Turkish footballers
Association football central defenders
Turkey international footballers
Galatasaray S.K. footballers
Giresunspor footballers
Süper Lig players